The following is a list of episodes for the first season to the anime television series, Aikatsu!, which aired between October 8, 2012 and September 26, 2013. The series, produced by Sunrise in collaboration with Bandai, follows Ichigo Hoshimiya and her friends as they participate in idol activities at Starlight Academy, a school for budding idols. The season uses four pieces of theme music. Daisuki began streaming the season in September 2014, and are also streaming the series on YouTube until the end of 2014.

Episodes

References

2012 Japanese television seasons
Aikatsu!
Aikatsu! episode lists